James Barrington (born 4 January 1960) is an English cricketer. He played four first-class matches for Cambridge University Cricket Club in 1982.

See also
 List of Cambridge University Cricket Club players

References

External links
 

1960 births
Living people
English cricketers
Cambridge University cricketers
Cricketers from Carshalton